Amanti di valore is an album by Italian singer Mina, issued in 1973 and distributed back to back with the album Frutta e verdura.

Track listing

Side A

Side B

Credits
Mina – vocals
Pino Presti and Carlo Pes – arrangers
Dario Baldan Bembo – organ, piano, electric piano, eminent 
Renzo Bergonzi – percussion instrument in "La solita storia d'amore"
Bruno De Filippi – harmonica 
Tullio De Piscopo – drum kit, conga
Lino Liguori – drum kit
Carlo Pes – acoustic guitar, electric guitar, twelve-string guitar
Pino Presti – bass, rhodes piano, percussion instrument
Arturo Prestipino Giarritta – violin
Andrea Sacchi – electric guitar, classical guitar, lap steel guitar
Nuccio Rinaldis – sound engineer

1973 albums
Mina (Italian singer) albums
Italian-language albums
Albums conducted by Pino Presti
Albums arranged by Pino Presti